Blood Rage may refer to:

Blood Rage, a 2015 board game by CoolMiniOrNot designed by Eric Lang
Blood Rage, a 1987 horror film directed by John Grissmer
Bloodrage, a 1979 horror film directed by Joseph Zito